The Metschnikowiaceae are a family of yeasts in the order Saccharomycetales that reproduce by budding. It contains the genera Clavispora and Metschnikowia. Species in the family have a widespread distribution, especially in tropical areas.

References

Yeasts
Saccharomycetes